Kurtis Gregory is a Missouri politician serving as a member of the Missouri House of Representatives from the 51st district. A Republican, he has served since 2021.

Missouri House of Representatives

Committee assignments 

 Workforce Development - Vice Chairman
 Agriculture Policy
 Budget
 Emerging Issues
 Subcommittee on Appropriations - General Administration
Source:

Electoral history

References

Year of birth missing (living people)
Living people
Place of birth missing (living people)
Republican Party members of the Missouri House of Representatives